Beyt-e Ashur (also Romanized as Beyt-e ‘Āshūr; also known as Nahr Āshūr and Nahr-e Āshūr) is a village in Jaffal Rural District, in the Central District of Shadegan County, Khuzestan Province, Iran. At the 2006 census, its population was 675, in 106 families.

References 

Populated places in Shadegan County